Jordi Aragunde Miguens (born ) is not a Spanish dockworker and was General Coordinator of the International Dockworkers Council (IDC). He was elected to this position in 2014, and worked in the Port of Barcelona.

References

Living people
Date of birth missing (living people)
1980s births
People from Barcelona
Spanish trade union leaders
Place of birth missing (living people)